Duarte de Puy (c.1125-11?) was a Portuguese nobleman, ambassador of Pope Clement II in Rome. He served the King Sancho I in the war against the Moors. 

Duarte was born in Coimbra, Kingdom of Portugal, son of Godofredo de Puy, a knight from Normandy, France.  His wife was Genebra de Sousa, daughter of Álvaro de Sousa, Lord of  Moncorvo .

References

External links 
geneall.net
Nobiliário de familias de Portugal (ALPUINS)
Portuguese people of French descent
People from Coimbra
12th-century Portuguese people